Norreys (also spelt Norris) may refer to various members of, or estates belonging to, a landed family chiefly seated in the English counties of Berkshire and Lancashire and the Irish county of Cork.

Famous family members
Baron Norreys of Rycote
Earl of Abingdon whose secondary title is Baron Norreys of Rycote
Sir John Norreys (Esquire), Keeper of the Wardrobe for King Henry VI of England
Alice Norreys, 15th century Lady of the Garter
Sir William Norreys, 15th century Lancastrian soldier
Sir John Norreys (usher), 16th century courtier and usher to members of the House of Tudor
Sir Henry Norreys, 16th century courtier accused of adultery with Queen Anne Boleyn
Henry Norris, 1st Baron Norreys, 16th century ambassador to France
Sir John Norreys, 16th century English soldier
Sir Edward Norreys, 16th century Governor of Ostend and English Member of Parliament
Sir  William Norris, 1st Baronet of Speke, Member of Parliament for Liverpool and Ambassador to the Mughal Emperor

See also
Hampstead Norreys in Berkshire
Norreys Estate at Wokingham in Berkshire
Yattendon Castle in Berkshire
Ockwells Manor in Berkshire
Jephson family
Mallow Castle in Cork, Ireland
Norris (surname)

External links
Royal Berkshire History: The Norreys Family of Ockwells, Yattendon & Winkfield

English families
People from Berkshire
People from Lancashire